Cruising with Ruben & the Jets is the fourth studio album by the Mothers of Invention, released under the alias Ruben and the Jets. Released on December 2, 1968 on Bizarre and Verve Records with distribution by MGM Records, it is a concept album, influenced by 1950s doo-wop and rock and roll. The album's concept deals with a fictitious Chicano doo-wop band called Ruben & the Jets, represented by the cover illustration by Cal Schenkel, which depicts the Mothers of Invention as anthropomorphic dogs. It was conceived as part of a project called No Commercial Potential, which produced three other albums: Lumpy Gravy, We're Only in It for the Money and Uncle Meat.

The album and its singles received some radio success, due to its doo-wop sound. Subsequently, the name Ruben and the Jets continued with a different lineup, led by musician Rubén Guevara Jr., who recorded the albums For Real! (1973) and Con Safos (1974). Zappa produced the former.

Background 

During a previous recording session, engineer Richard Kunc and the Mothers of Invention discussed their high school days and love for doo-wop songs. Ray Collins and some of the other members of the band started singing and performing the songs, and Zappa suggested that they record an album of doo-wop music.  Zappa described the album as an homage to the 1950s vocal music that he was "crazy" about. Collins later left the Mothers of Invention, and Zappa began working on a project entitled No Commercial Potential, which included sessions that produced Cruising with Ruben & the Jets, as well as We're Only in It for the Money, a revised version of Lumpy Gravy, and Uncle Meat.
After the Mothers of Invention's contract with MGM and Verve Records expired, Zappa and Herb Cohen negotiated to form Bizarre Productions, with Verve releasing three Bizarre releases with distribution by MGM: a new Mothers of Invention album, Cruising with Ruben & the Jets, the compilation Mothermania, and an album by Sandy Hurvitz, Sandy's Album is Here at Last.

Zappa stated, regarding the releases Lumpy Gravy, We're Only in It for the Money, Cruising with Ruben & the Jets and Uncle Meat, "It's all one album. All the material in the albums is organically related and if I had all the master tapes and I could take a razor blade and cut them apart and put it together again in a different order it still would make one piece of music you can listen to. Then I could take that razor blade and cut it apart and reassemble it a different way, and it still would make sense. I could do this twenty ways. The material is definitely related."

Recording 

Ray Collins rejoined the Mothers of Invention for the doo-wop recording sessions of No Commercial Potential, as his high falsetto was suited for the recordings. According to Collins, "I brought the style of being raised in Pomona, California, being raised on the Four Aces, the Four Freshmen, Frankie Laine, Frank Sinatra and Jesse Baldwin. The early influences of R&B came into the Southern California area when I was probably in the tenth grade in high school. And I remember Peter Potter's show, and I think I recall the first R&B tune on there was 'Oop-Shoop'. Frank actually had more influences from the 'real blues', you know, like Muddy Waters, those kind of people. But I wasn't into that in my early life. I was more of the pop culture, pop radio things, and it's always been more of a favourite of mine than the early blues stuff - even though I love John Lee Hooker and all those people."

According to Bunk Gardner, "Cruising with Ruben & the Jets was an easy album to record. We were recording it at the same time as Uncle Meat because the songs were easy and very simple and didn't require a lot of time for arrangements and technical overdubbing. It was the beginning of the end for Ray Collins because all the new material Frank was writing was a little too far out and away from Ray's roots - which was Ruben-era material. Motorhead too was in his glory during the recording of this album. He loved Ruben and that was really his kind of music to get nostalgic over - on stage and doing the dance steps and playing that music [...] I really enjoyed playing a solo on Ray's tune 'Anything'. I remember Frank, Ray and Roy standing in the control booth while I recorded my solo. Frank was telling me after the first take to keep it simple. So I nailed it on the second take and everyone was happy!"

The doo-wop recordings were reconstituted as the concept album Cruising with Ruben and the Jets; the album included four rerecordings of songs that were on the Mothers' first album Freak Out!: "How Could I Be Such a Fool"; "You Didn't Try to Call Me"; "Anyway the Wind Blows"; and "I'm Not Satisfied". Their arrangements were altered to fit within the album's concept.

Concept 

Within the concept of the album, Ruben Sano was the leader of the fictitious Chicano band "the Jets". The back cover depicted Ruben with an early high school photograph of Zappa. According to artist Cal Schenkel, "I started working on the story of Ruben and the Jets that is connected with the Uncle Meat story, which is this old guy turns this teenage band into these dog snout people [...] We started that before it actually became Ruben and the Jets. That came out of my love for comics and that style, the anthropomorphic animals, but also it was part of a running story line."

Zappa stated regarding the album's lyrics, "I detest 'love lyrics'." He intentionally wrote lyrics he described as "sub-Mongoloid" to satirize the genre. The music of Cruising with Ruben & the Jets was the most straightforward genre work the Mothers of Invention had performed yet, attempting to faithfully reproduce the sound of 1950s doo-wop and rock and roll. However, the arrangements included quotes from Igor Stravinsky pieces and unusual chord changes and tempos.

Release and legacy 

The album was popular with radio stations, as they believed it to be an unearthed doo-wop album by an unknown band called Ruben & the Jets. A single was issued ("Deseri" b/w a remixed and overdubbed version of "Jelly Roll Gum Drop") credited to "Ruben and the Jets", with no mention of the Mothers of Invention; according to Zappa, later pressings, which credited the Mothers of Invention, did not receive as much airplay as the original "Ruben" pressings. The album's cover has a word balloon stating "Is this the Mothers of Invention recording under a different name in a last ditch attempt to get their cruddy music on the radio?" Zappa later dismissed claims that he had "fooled people" with this album as "nonsense".

Subsequently, Zappa stated that the Mothers of Invention would record a second doo-wop album under the alias Ruben & the Jets. Later, the band Ruben and the Jets continued with a different lineup, led by musician Rubén Guevara Jr., who recorded the albums For Real! (1973) and Con Safos (1974). Zappa produced the former.

Reissues 

In 1984, Zappa prepared a remix of Cruising with Ruben & the Jets for its compact disc reissue and the vinyl box set The Old Masters I. The remix featured new rhythm tracks recorded by bassist Arthur Barrow and drummer Chad Wackerman, much as the 1984 remix of We're Only in It for the Money had featured. Zappa stated "The master tapes for Ruben and the Jets were in better shape, but since I liked the results on We're Only in it For the Money, I decided to do it on Ruben too. But those are the only two albums on which the original performances were replaced. I thought the important thing was the material itself."

After the remixing was announced, a $13 million lawsuit was filed against Zappa by Jimmy Carl Black, Bunk Gardner and Don Preston, who were later joined by Ray Collins, Art Tripp and Motorhead Sherwood, increasing the claim to $16.4 million, stating that they had received no royalties from Zappa since 1969.

In 2009, the original mix of the album was released as part of a compilation entitled Greasy Love Songs. Allmusic's François Couture gave the album's 1984 remix 3 out of 5 stars. Another writer for the site, Sean Westergaard, gave Greasy Love Songs 4 out of 5 stars.

Track listing

Personnel

 Musicians
 Ray Collins – lead vocals
 Frank Zappa –  low grumbles, oo-wah and lead guitar (also drums, piano, bass)
 Roy Estrada – high weazlings, dwaedy-doop and electric bass
 Jimmy Carl Black and/or Arthur Dyer Tripp III – lewd pulsating rhythm
 Ian Underwood or Don Preston – redundant piano triplets
 Motorhead Sherwood – baritone sax and tambourine
 Bunk Gardner and Ian Underwood – tenor and alto saxes

 Production
Producer: Frank Zappa
Engineer: Dick Kunc
Cover Art: Cal Schenkel
Cover Design: Cal Schenkel
Artwork: Cal Schenkel

Charts
Album - Billboard (United States)

References

1968 albums
Albums produced by Frank Zappa
Bizarre Records albums
Doo-wop albums
Experimental pop albums
The Mothers of Invention albums
Ruben and the Jets albums
Verve Records albums
Concept albums